Emma Mitchell is a Ghanaian politician and an advocate on gender issues. She was the Minister for Trade and Industry of Ghana between 1993 and 1996. She described Rawlings as someone who whose administration style was built on consensus rather than authoritariansim.

Minister for Trade and Industry
Mitchell resigned from the Rawlings government in February 1996. She reported that this was over a disagreement with the President, Jerry Rawlings. She reported that after she left government and the facts of the disagreement had been established, Rawlings invited her back into government but she opted to stay out.

Council of state
In 2001, Mitchell was appointed to the Council of State by John Kufuor, President of Ghana along with 11 others. She served on the council between 2001 and 2004.

Notes and references 

Living people
Year of birth missing (living people)
Trade ministers of Ghana
Industry ministers of Ghana